Annab may be:
 the Persian word for dried jujube fruit
 a surname; notable people with the name include:
 Lens Annab (born 1988), Belgian-Algerian football player
 Lina Annab (born 1966), Jordanian businesswoman and politician
 Radi Annab (1897–1999), Jordanian general